Fort St. James (Perison) Airport  is located  south of Fort St. James, British Columbia, Canada.

See also
Fort St. James/Stuart River Water Aerodrome

References

Registered aerodromes in British Columbia
Regional District of Bulkley-Nechako